Ardabil County is in Ardabil province, Iran. The capital of the county is the city of Ardabil. At the 2006 census, the county's population was 542,930 in 131,950 households. The following census in 2011 counted 564,365 people in 156,242 households, by which time Sareyn District had been separated from the county to form Sareyn County. At the 2016 census, the county's population was 605,992 in 180,975 households.

Administrative divisions

The population history and structural changes of Ardabil County's administrative divisions over three consecutive censuses are shown in the following table. The latest census shows three districts, 10 rural districts, and two cities.

References

 

Counties of Ardabil Province